Peter Gerety (born May 17, 1940) is an American actor. He is best known as Judge Daniel Phelan in The Wire (2002–2008).

Career
Gerety is a veteran of stage, screen and television. In early 1992, he performed to critical acclaim on Broadway in Conversations with My Father, starring Judd Hirsch, and in Harold Pinter's Hothouse. He has since performed in many more plays both on and off-Broadway, most recently in Martin McDonagh's The Lieutenant of Inishmore.

In the late 1990s, he joined the cast of the Barry Levinson produced NBC police drama Homicide: Life on the Street. He played FBI Agt. Franklin Morgan in the short-lived American adaptation of Life on Mars. In the final season of Brotherhood as Martin Kilpatrick. He appears in the 2011 NBC series Prime Suspect as Maria Bello's father.

He also appeared in such feature films as K-Pax, People I Know, The Curse of the Jade Scorpion, Hollywood Ending, Wolf, Charlie Wilson's War, Surviving Picasso, War of the Worlds, Things That Hang from Trees, Inside Man, and Changeling. He played Louis Piquett in Public Enemies (2009), directed by Michael Mann, and had a small part in Mel Gibson's Get the Gringo (2011). In 2013, Gerety was playing the role of John Cotter in Nora Ephron's Broadway play Lucky Guy with Tom Hanks. In 2017, Gerety plays Otto Bernhardt, the patriarch of the Amazon Prime series Sneaky Pete.

Filmography

Film

Television

References

External links

1940 births
Male actors from Rhode Island
American male film actors
American male television actors
Living people
Male actors from Boston
Actors from Providence, Rhode Island
20th-century American male actors
21st-century American male actors
Boston University alumni